This is the discography of Shyne, a Beliezan rapper.

Albums

Studio albums

Mixtapes
Clinton Sparks & DJ Rukiz: Shyne - If I Could Start from Scratch (2004)
Gangland (2012)

Unofficial Mixtapes
The Truth: Advance (2001)
Lost Sons (2003)
Life After the Club (2004)
Lost Tapes (2004)
DJ Laser Presents Shyne - The Son of Sam (2009)
25 to Life Plus 9 (2009)
Suge White & Shyne - Best of Shyne (2009)
DJ Messiah & DJ Antalive: Shyne 10 Years & Still Shyne'in (2009)
Welcome Home (Best of Shyne) (2009)
Shyne's Home (Oct. 6) (2009)
DJ Dizzy Donmez Hip-Hop Nights Shyne On (2010)
The Shyning (2010)

Singles

Guest appearances

References

Hip hop discographies